Dinmuhammed Kanatuly Kudaibergen (Dınmūhammed Qanatūly Qūdaibergen), born 24 May 1994, known professionally as Dimash Qudaibergen, is a Kazakh singer, songwriter, and multi-instrumentalist. He is university-trained in classical as well as contemporary music, and is known for his exceptionally wide vocal range. He has performed songs in thirteen languages.

Although offered a position at the Astana Opera, he decided to carve out his career in contemporary music, mixing classical elements and traditional Kazakh music with pop music.

He gained significant popularity in Kazakhstan and other post-Soviet countries in 2015 upon becoming the Grand Prix winner of Slavianski Bazaar in Vitebsk, Belarus. He rose to fame in China with his participation as a "wildcard competitor" in Hunan TV's Singer 2017 finishing second overall.

Early life 
Dinmuhammed ("Dimash") Kanatuly Kudaibergen was born on 24 May 1994 in Aktobe, to Qanat Qūdaibergenūly Aitbaev and Svetlana Aitbaeva.  His father previously led the regional Cultural Development Board of Aktobe. His mother is a soprano singer at the Aktobe Philharmonic Society, a Member of the Standing Committee on Social and Cultural Development (Deputy of Maslihat of Aktobe region) and Artistic Director of the children's studio Saz in the Aktobe Region.

Kudaibergen was brought up in a close-knit musical family, and his grandparents played a major role in his upbringing, which followed largely traditional Kazakh customs.

Kudaibergen began performing at a young age, singing and playing the piano. His first appearance on stage was at the age of two in a minor role in a local theatre production. At home Kudaibergen took an interest in musical instruments, and his parents and his music teacher noticed that he had absolute pitch. At the age of five, he began to take piano and vocal lessons at the children's studio of the local music college. Kudaibergen first sang on stage the same year, at the age of five. At the age of six, in 2000, he won the national piano contest Aynalayin.

Education 

At the age of five, Kudaibergen began to take piano and vocal lessons at the children's studio of Aktobe's Akhmet Zhubanov Music College. He later attended Gymnasium No. 32 in Aktobe. Kudaibergen completed a Broadway Musical master class in 2009. In 2014, he graduated in Classical Music with Major in Vocal (Bel Canto) from the music institute of K. Zhubanov University in Aktobe and began his studies in Contemporary Music (Jazz, Pop) at Kazakh National University of Arts in Astana, where he graduated with Major in Vocal on 27 June 2018. On 18 June 2020, he graduated from the same university with a Master's Degree in Composition by defending his Master's thesis with a perfect score, and receiving a recommendation for admission to doctoral studies in music.

Kudaibergen plays seven instruments: piano, keyboards, dombra, drums, guitar, marimba and bayan.

He speaks Kazakh and Russian, and is studying English and Mandarin. He has performed songs in 13 languages, Kazakh, Russian, English, Mandarin Chinese, Italian, French, Spanish, German, Serbian, Turkish, Ukrainian, Kyrgyz, and Japanese.

In December 2022, Dimash Kudaibergen became the owner of the Bolashak International Scholarship.

Career

2010–2014: Early career 

From 2010 to 2013 Kudaibergen participated in and won four major singing competitions, in Kazakhstan (Sonorous Voices of Baikonur, 2010, and Zhas Kanat, 2012), Ukraine (Oriental Bazaar, 2012), and Kyrgyzstan (Meikin Asia, 2013).

With winning the prestigious National Zhas Kanat Contest in 2012, Kudaibergen gained for the first time wide attention from the Kazakh national media. He won the three-day vocal competition with a full jury score of 180 out of 180 points; the first time in the history of the contest. That same year he released his first self-composed work "Körkemım". In 2013 he was invited to perform as a guest singer at the Türkçevizyon Gala Night in Denizli, Turkey.

In December 2014, Kudaibergen was awarded a laureate of the State Youth Prize Daryn.

2015–2016: Slavianski Bazaar, international performances and Unforgettable Day Tour 

Following his graduation, Kudaibergen performed in various European and Asian countries. In 2015, he was invited to participate at the Slavic Bazaar in Vitebsk, Belarus, an annual international contest for prominent singers, after one of the organizers had seen him perform live in Kazakhstan. Kudaibergen went on to win the Grand Prix on 13 July 2015, with a score of 175 points out of 180. During the three days of the contest, he was the clear favorite of both the jury and audience. With his original renditions of the Kazakh folk song "Daididau", the Russian singer Alla Pugacheva's "Blizzard Again" and the French singer Daniel Balavoine's "SOS d'un terrien en détresse", he gained wide recognition from the jury and international media. Chairman of the jury, Polad Bülbüloğlu, stated that Kudaibergen possessed three voices in one: a low and medium voice, and altino, a rare voice, and that he used all of them professionally.

Upon winning Slavianski Bazaar, Kudaibergen regularly appeared in national TV shows and public events. His guest performances included at Expo 2015 in Milan, Italy; at the theatrical show Mangilik El, dedicated to the 550th anniversary of the Kazakh Khanate; at the 2015 Eurasia International Film Festival in Almaty; and at an Astana Opera Concert that was attended by the Chinese President Xi Jinping.

Kudaibergen released his second own composition "Unforgettable Day" in August 2015. In October 2015, Kudaibergen was selected to represent Kazakhstan at the 2015 ABU TV Song Festival in Istanbul, Turkey. Kudaibergen performed "Daididau", receiving a standing ovation. In November, Kudaibergen performed at the closing ceremony of Mary – Culture and Arts Capital of the Turkic World festival, in Turkmenistan.

Kudaibergen released his self-titled debut extended play (EP) on 1 January 2016. He appeared on various TV shows singing "My Swan" in a duet with Mayra Muhammad-kyzy. In February 2016, his rendition of "Daididau" was selected by the European Broadcasting Union to represent Kazakhstan in their "Around the World in 80 Minutes of Music" program dedicated to the World Radio Day 2016 that was played by radio stations around the world. In March Kudaibergen sang with his parents at the Women's Day concert in Astana, and took part in the "All Stars for My Beloved" concert dedicated to International Women's Day at the Kremlin Palace in Moscow. In March and April, he went on tour with the Kazakh University of Arts Symphony Orchestra in Vienna, Austria; Maribor, Slovenia; and Belgrade, Serbia, performing "SOS d'un terrien en détresse" and "Daididau".

Kudaibergen had his first headlined tour from April to December 2016, in celebration of the 25th anniversary of independence of Kazakhstan. Kudaibergen achieved 21 out of the 27 total planned concerts in 25 regions of Kazakhstan, which also included two additional concerts in the cities of Kazan and Ufa in Russia. He named his tour Unforgettable Day, after his own song by the same name. The concerts consisted of a wide variety of songs in various languages.

In July 2016, he was invited to perform at the Slavic Bazaar opening ceremony in Belarus, where he sang a duet with Nagima Eskalieva, and was also honored to raise the flag of the festival. In 2016 Kudaibergen also served as a judge at Bala Dausy 2016 (Voice of Children 2016).

Other performance highlights of Kudaibergen in 2016 included his guest performance at the annual Zhas Kanat Contest; and his performances of "Diva Dance" at an Astana Day Concert that was attended by the President of Kazakhstan; of the rap song "I Am Kazakh" (with Yerbolat and Alashuly) at Almaty's 1000th Birthday Gala Concert; at a UNESCO event in Paris, France; his performance at the Turkic Culture Festival in Seoul, South Korea, performing for the presidents of South Korea, Kazakhstan, Turkey, Kyrgyzstan, Azerbaijan, and Turkmenistan; and he represented Kazakhstan, alongside baritone Sundet Baigozhin, as a guest singer at the Big Opera 2016 TV competition in Russia.

In November 2016, the director of Astana Opera State Theatre, Toleubek Alpiyev, invited Kudaibergen to work as an opera singer, stating that his voice would be "ideal for baroque opera", but he decided to pursue a career in contemporary music.

2017: Singer, success in China and solo concert Bastau 

In early 2017, Kudaibergen appeared in the fifth season of Hunan Television's I Am a Singer under the recommendation of director Hong Tao, and signed a contract with Black Gold Talent in Beijing. At 22, he was the youngest participant in the history of the show, and competed against professional and top-selling Chinese singers as a 'wildcard' competitor. Kudaibergen's mother later said that he hoped to reach at least the middle stage of the competition.

He won Episodes 1, 2 and 6, with his performances of "S.O.S d'un terrien en détresse", "Opera 2", and "Adagio". He made it to the finals, and finished as runner-up to Hong Kong singer Sandy Lam.

In episode 1 of Singer 2017 Kudaibergen sang "SOS d'un terrien en détresse". After winning this episode, Kudaibergen's name became prominent in social media and his success made headlines in China, Kazakhstan as well as French media and TV programs.

Kudaibergen also won episode 2 with his version of Vitas' "Opera 2", and came in third in Episode 3 with his rendition of Queen's "The Show Must Go On". Hunan TV and the Chinese media named him "a bridge for Kazakh-Chinese cultural cooperation". Between the recordings of episodes 3 and 4, Kudaibergen performed at the 2017 Winter Universiade Opening Ceremony, singing Sarah Brightman's "A Question of Honor" with Zarina Altynbayeva. He performed his first ever Mandarin song "Late Autumn" in Episode 4 and ranked 3rd. During the broadcast of episode 4, Kudaibergen's meeting with Jackie Chan, his childhood idol, was shown. Kudaibergen won episode 6 with his rendition of Lara Fabian's "Adagio" – a performance which was praised by Fabian.

For episode 7 Kudaibergen performed his rendition of the traditional Kazakh folk song "Daididau", accompanied by the Folk Instrumental Ensemble of Kudaibergen's university, the Kazakh National University of Arts. Kudaibergen and the instrumentalists performed wearing traditional Kazakh costumes. He started the performance by playing a traditional piece named "Adai" on the dombra, and then sang "Daididau". He came in third. His performance was received positively and sparked interest in Kazakh music and culture in China. Kudaibergen later said in an interview that this gave him the opportunity to "make sure once again that music knows no boundaries". After the broadcast of episode 7, a documentary about Kudaibergen aired on Hunan TV.

Kudaibergen sang his own song "Unforgettable Day" for episode 10, with a section of the lyrics translated into Mandarin. He came in third place. Within a few days "Unforgettable Day" reached the top of the Fresh Asia Music Charts. On 5 April, he released his first Chinese single "Eternal Memories", theme song of the movie Battle of Memories.

In episode 12 of Singer, the semi-final, Kudaibergen sang Adriano Celentano's "Confessa" in Italian, followed by "The Diva Dance" from the movie The Fifth Element. He placed second and was promoted to the final. On 12 April, he released his single "Go Go Power Rangers", theme song of the movie Power Rangers in China.

In the final of Singer 2017, Kudaibergen sang "A Tribute to MJ" in a duet with Laure Shang. He finished Singer 2017 as runner-up. For the final episode of Singer 2017, Episode 14, the gala episode, Kudaibergen performed a new song in Kazakh, "Give Me Love" (Makhabbat Ber Magan).

During Singer, Kudaibergen appeared on various Chinese TV programs, including "Happy Camp", My Boyfriend's A Superstar/Fan Fan Boyfriend and Come Sing with Me (where fans were selected to sing with their idol);and had many other performances in China, including at the Chinese Top Ten Music Awards in Shanghai, where he won his first Chinese Award, namely for "Best Asian Singer"; at the Top Chinese Music Awards in Shenzhen, China, which are considered to be the Asian equivalent to the Grammy Awards, where he performed "Unforgettable Day" accompanied by Ouyang Nana on the piano, and won the "Most Popular International Singer" Award; and at the Meeting on the Silk Road Gala, held by the Embassy of Kazakhstan and China's Department of Culture, in Beijing.

Upon returning to Kazakhstan after the completion of Singer 2017, he was welcomed with a congratulatory event in Astana.

Following Singer 2017, Kudaibergen appeared and performed on numerous TV shows and public events in China, Kazakhstan and France.

His performances in France included his performance of "SOS d'un terrien en détresse" in the popular France 2 TV show Les Années Bonheur; his charity performances at the Global Gift Galas in Paris and Cannes (to which he was invited by the foundation's Honorary Chair Eva Longoria); at the Cannes Film Festival. and at the Ruhani Zhangyru UNESCO Gala in Paris.

On 27 June 2017 he held his first large-scale solo concert Bastau ("Beginning") in Astana, Kazakhstan. Most of the three-hour concert was accompanied by a live orchestra; guest singers included Terry Lin, Loreen, Sophie Ellis-Bextor and Marat Aitimov; and Kudaibergen performed duets with Maira Mukhamedkyzy, Kristina Orbakaitė and with his parents, Svetlana Aitbayeva and Kanat Aitbayev. Along with popular pieces from Singer 2017 and pre-Singer, he also debuted his new songs "My Star", "Without You", "Last Word", and "Leyla". Bastau was well-received and sold out to a crowd of around 30,000 people.

In July, Kudaibergen's new song "Ocean over Time" was released in China as the theme song for the game Moonlight Blade, that later won a Hollywood Music in Media Award. In the same month he sang at the Closing Ceremony of Slavic Bazaar in Vitebsk, Belarus, where his international career had started in 2015 and performed several songs for the audience of the 2017 Eurasia International Film Festival and its honorary guests Nicolas Cage and Adrien Brody.

On 16 September, Dimash performed as the headliner at the Gakku Open-Air Festival in Almaty, to a crowd of 150,000 people. Prior to this event, his highest recorded note was G#7 in whistle register, on par with Mariah Carey. At the Gakku Festival, he surpassed himself by hitting D8 during "Unforgettable Day".

In 2017 the Kazakh figure skater Denis Ten, who was an Olympic medalist and friend of Kudaibergen, began using his rendition of "SOS d'un terrien en détresse" for his skating programs.

2018: Continued success in China and breakthrough in Russia 

In 2018, Kudaibergen continued having numerous performances in China. To highlight a few: he performed "Flight of the Bumblebee" and "Auld Lang Syne" (in Mandarin), accompanied by pianists Wu Muye and Maksim Mrvica, at the CCTV Spring Festival Gala; "Jasmine" in a duet with the Grammy-winner Wu Tong at the Chinese New Year Gala; a rendition of Lionel Richie's "Hello" as a guest performer at Singer 2018; and "Daididau", accompanied by an orchestra, at the One Belt One Road Gala. He was invited as guest and performer at the "Choose Big Star" variety show; performed "You and Me" in a duet with Wáng Lì at the Chinese Mid Autumn Festival, and premiered his first English single "Screaming" at the "Idol Hits" show. In December he performed his own composition "Unforgettable Day" at the Miss World 2018 Final, and Celine Dion's "My Heart Will Go On" at the Hainan International Film Festival.

Kudaibergen also participated in the "PhantaCity" short video play, in which he starred as the main actor and performed "If I Never Breathe Again" and "When You Believe".
 
He held three solo concerts in 2018: two "D-Dynasty" concerts in Fuzhou, and Shenzhen; and a solo concert in London, within the scope of the "Kazakhstan Day of Culture".

In May, Kudaibergen performed at the 71st Cannes Film Festival. In July, he appeared at the Slavic Bazaar 2018 in Vitebsk, Belarus, as a judge and guest performer, and sang "SOS d'un terrien en détresse". In September, he participated as a guest at the international contest for young pop singers New Wave in Sochi, Russia, where he performed "Sinful Passion" for the first time, and sang "Adagio" at the closing ceremony.

In November 2018 his collaboration with the renowned Russian composer Igor Krutoy started with their first single "Love of Tired Swans" ("Lyubov' ustavshikh lebedey"). Many performances in Russia followed and in December, at the annual "Pesnya Goda" Gala in Moscow, "Love of Tired Swans" was awarded one of the best songs of 2018.

2019: The World's Best in the United States and solo concert Arnau

In January, he joined the Super Vocal TV competition for classical singers in China as a member of the judges.

In early 2019, Kudaibergen participated in the CBS talent competition The World's Best, in which he was presented to the US audience as the "Six Octave Man" and "man with the world's widest vocal range". He performed "SOS d'un terrien en détresse" in the audition round and "All by Myself" in the battle round. Despite being listed as front-runner, Kudaibergen withdrew from the competition in the champions round (semi-final), citing that he wished to leave the opportunity to younger performers, and after withdrawing he performed "Adagio" (the other two contestants of this round were the 13-year-old Indian pianist Lydian Nadhaswaram and the 12-year-old Kazakh singer Daneliya Tuleshova).

On 13 June 2019, he released his first album, iD, in China. It reached platinum status within 37 seconds after release, and triple-platinum within the first hour.

He held his second large-scale solo concert, Arnau, in the Astana Arena in Nur-Sultan, Kazakhstan, on 29 June 2019, and the sell-out performance attracted 40,000 people.

In 2019, he continued his collaboration with Igor Krutoy with the songs "Mademoiselle Hyde", "Love is Like a Dream", "Know", "Olimpico" (also known as "Ogni Pietra"), "Where Love Lives", "Passione", "Ulisse" (duet with Aida Garifullina) and "Ti Amo Così" (with Aida Garifullina and Lara Fabian), "Love of Tired Swans" . In October and November, he joined Krutoy as a guest performer on the Igor Krutoy Anniversary Tour, performing in New York City, Dubai, Minsk, and Düsseldorf.

On 5 December 2019, Kudaibergen was awarded "Best Vocalist in Classical Music" and won a Special Prize for "Discovery of the Year" at the Russian National Music Awards "Victoria" that are considered the Russian equivalent to the Grammy Awards. 
Kudaibergen gave his first solo concert in the USA on 10 December 2019. The show was titled Arnau Envoy and took place at the Barclays Center in New York. The venue was sold out with 19,000 spectators from 63 countries.

Among Kudaibergen's 2019 performances in Russia were his guest performances at the New Wave in Sochi, his headlining performance at the closing ceremony of the WorldSkills championships in Kazan, and the Igor Krutoy Anniversary Gala on Ice in Moscow. 

He also had more performances in China, including a Queen medley that he performed with the Super Vocal finalists at Singer 2019; a headlining performance at the Mount Emei Music Festival; at the Asian Culture Carnival; at the Opening Ceremony of the Jackie Chan International Action Film Week; at the Closing and Award Ceremony of the Silk Road International Film Festival; and a guest performance at Masked Singer China.

Other international performances included the premiere of his song "Olimpico" (also known as "Ogni Pietra") at the Opening Ceremony of the European Games in Minsk, Belarus; and he represented Kazakhstan at the 2019 ABU TV Song Festival in Tokyo, Japan, performing "SOS d'un terrien en détresse".

2020: Arnau tour and appearance on MTV USA 

In early 2020, he appeared on two movie soundtracks, singing Hāi pí yíxià for Vanguard and Across Endless Dimensions, theme song of Creators: The Past.

In February his Arnau Europe Tour started, but was interrupted in March due to the COVID-19 pandemic.

In May, he performed on live stream at Tokyo Jazz Festival (jp), and in June appeared on CCTV1's Everlasting Classics (zh) singing Tang Dynasty poetry by Zhang Jiuling.

On 18 June 2020, IPZUSA, a company based in New Jersey, officially announced on its website that a contract had been signed with Kudaibergen, to provide family-focused management, representation and consulting.

On 30 September 2020, it was announced that Kudaibergen would debut a Kazakh language song, being the first artist from Kazakhstan to appear on the official YouTube channel of MTV USA.  
His songs continued to be ranked in the Top 5 by MTV USA Livestream for the next 10 weeks from 2 October to 18 December 2020.  
Interviews were broadcast on MTV USA Youtube Livestream with Kudaibergen and Host Kevan Kenney between December 2020 and February 2021.

In November 2020 Kudaibergen was interviewed for Muz-TV, answering questions about his career and life.
  
On 3 December 2020, it was announced that Kudaibergen would be presenting his first online digital concert on a global streaming platform, Tixr.  
The online concert Dimash Digital Show was to be a charity event, with part of the proceeds donated to Project C.U.R.E.
 
In December 2020, Kudaibergen released his new music video for "I Miss You" with the collaboration of the Russian director Evgeny Kuritsyn.

2021: Dimash Digital Show 

On 16 January 2021, Kudaibergen held his first online concert – Dimash Digital Show.
His performance of "SOS d'un terrien en détresse", "War and Peace", along with 15 other songs, marked the artist's collaboration with Project C.U.R.E.

Later that week two special performances (on 17 January, "Samaltau", and on 20 January, "SOS d'un terrien en détresse") performed by Kudaibergen were streamed by Sister Cities International for their 2021 Online Annual Gala Event, with the theme All Roads Lead to Diplomacy.

On 31 January 2021, the single "Golden" music video by Kudaibergen made its official debut via the Tixr American streaming platform immediately following the encore of the Dimash Digital Show on the same day.

From 15 January to 4 June 2021, Kudaibergen continually received a Top 5 ranking from the MTV USA Friday Livestream. 
For 29 Weeks, from October 2020 to June 2021, there have been five top rated Kudaibergen music videos streamed by MTV USA Friday Livestream to the North American market and around the world.

In March 2021 and May 2021 Kudaibergen released videos of his singles for Kazakhstan celebrations, "Golden" for Nauryz, along with "Amanat" and "Kieli Meken", and "Qairan Elim" for the Unity Day.  
In May 2021, he also released a new music video for "Across Endless Dimensions", the OST for the Italian movie Creators: The Past. 
In April 2021 Kudaibergen released the single "Be With Me" and a new music video. The song originally premiered during his Dimash Digital Show on 16 January 2021.  
In June 2021, Kudaibergen released a new instrumental "River of Love" along with eminent Kazakh composer, Renat Gaissin.

In November 2021, Dimash Kudaibergen's song "Fly Away" took 6th place on Billboard's Hot Trending Songs, making the track one of the top 10 most mentioned songs on Twitter.

Also in November 2021, he performed "Ikanaide" or "Don't Go" by Kōji Tamaki for the 20th Tokyo Jazz Festival. It was his first song in Japanese.

2022: Dimash concerts in Dubai, Düsseldorf, Prague, Almaty 

Dimash held his first solo live concert since the pandemic in Dubai, UAE on March 25, 2022 at the Coca-Cola Arena. Then resumed two of his Arnau tour in Düsseldorf on April 9, 2022, and Prague on April 16, 2022.

In July Dimash announced his new concert tour Stranger to be held in Almaty, Kazakhstan on September 23, 2022 at the Central Stadium in the city.

Vocal range and style 
Kudaibergen is well-recognized for his extremely wide and developed vocal range. His sung range expands 6 octaves and 2 semitones, from C2 to C6 to F#6 and, finally, D8. This sequence shows his lowest note sung in vocal fry and chest voice, his highest note hit with his full modal voice, his highest note hit using falsetto/head voice, and his highest overall note, hit using the whistle register.

In terms of full notes hit, Dimash has used growls and frys to hit spoken notes around and below C2, some of which may or may not be counted as part of his range. This includes an E♭2, and an F♯1, various other frys around E♭2/D2, a G♯1 and a B♭1. Therefore, if counted, those notes make his range expand to more of 6 octaves and 8 semitones.

Kudaibergen sings in multiple musical genres. His main genre is classical crossover, but he also sings classical music (bel canto), pop, folk and world music. He uses musical elements, and vocal styles and techniques of many other genres, including jazz, rock (e.g. screams), RnB, musical theater, and rap.

He is also known for his use of the whistle register, and for singing in head voice.

Other ventures

Modeling 

Kudaibergen has been a model for fashion labels and for Lifestyle and Fashion magazines. He was on the magazine covers of Men's Health, Southern Metropolis, Starbox, Easy, L’Officiel Hommes, Ivyplume, Chic, Chic Teen, and Elle. He was also featured in photo series of other magazines, including Cosmopolitan and OnlyLady, and in fashion videos for e.g. Elle Shop and Cosmopolitan.

Acting 

Kudaibergen starred as an actor in several Chinese and Russian TV productions.

Singing contests 

Kudaibergen is the initiator in 2018 of the annual Kazah Baqytty Bala Children's Singing Contest. He also served as a jury member for Bala Dausy, Slavic Bazaar, Super Vocal and New Wave.

Awards and achievements

Discography 

 iD (2019)
 Dimash Kudaibergen and Igor Krutoy (2021)

Filmography

Solo concerts and international tours

Solo concerts

Tours

Fandom 

Kudaibergen calls his fans "Dears", which he explains in his own words as follows: "They are so devoted and give me so much support! So they are very dear to me. They are like family to me. Just as we love every member of the family, I love and cherish my fans and call them my dears."

In November 2021, it was announced that a museum dedicated to Dimash Kudaibergen will be established in the singer's home city, Aktobe, Kazakhstan.

Humanitarianism 

In 2015, Dimash Kudaibergen gave a charitable concert, named "From Heart to Heart", in Atyrau, Kazakhstan, to provide essential medical treatment for a 5-year-old girl. He was joined by the Kazakh pop singer Dosymzhan Tanatarov for the event.

Kudaibergen gave benefit performances at the Grand Charity Ball 2015, in the Kazakhstan cities of Shymkent, Kyzylorda and Uralsk. The events were organized by the Alpamys Sharimov Foundation, and the funds were donated to children with hearing and speech impairment.

In early 2016 he joined the Kazakh "Do Good" campaign that provides help for people with disabilities, illnesses and in financial need.

In 2016, he also gave a benefit performance at the "100 Grandmas and Grandpas" Charity Evening of the "Zaman Are We" Project in Astana, Kazakhstan. The elderly of the regional retirement homes were invited as honorary guests and the funds of the event were used for social, economic and medical help for elderly residents.
Kudaibergen donated all profits of his 2016 "Unforgettable Day" concert, held in his home town Aktobe, to a regional charity organization. With the funds of the concert, seven families in need were supplied with water, utilities, medical care and clothing. A wheelchair accessible ramp was also set up for a wheelchair-using resident.

He gave a benefit performance at the Grand Charity Ball 2016, in Uralsk, Kazakhstan. The teenage students of the local boarding school for visually impaired students were invited as honorary guests of the Ball. Several of these students performed a song on stage with him, and Kudaibergen also danced, in the Waltz part of the event, with the visually impaired invited guests. The Grand Charity Ball was organized by the Alpamys Sharimov Foundation, and the funds were donated to children with visual impairments, to this boarding school and to the regional orphanage.

At the Top Chinese Music Awards 2017, within the "Love Recycling" Campaign, he donated the suit from his first performance at Hunan Television's Singer 2017 competition. The suit was auctioned by the Jingdong Platform and all the proceeds were donated to the Care of Children Foundation for children with blood lead poisoning.

Kudaibergen gave charitable performances at the Global Gift Galas 2017 in Paris and Cannes. He was invited by Eva Longoria, Honorary Chair of the Global Gift Foundation. The Foundation provides social and economic help to children, families and women in situations of need.

Kudaibergen hosted a live broadcast for the Live Connection Challenge, a live stream charity campaign launched by Hongdou Live and Weibo Public Welfare. The campaign income was donated to the Audiology Development Foundation of China whose goal is to provide hearing and language rehabilitation for people with hearing impairment.

Kudaibergen donated an autographed dombra to an auction of the Smile Angel Foundation, a Chinese charity which aims to help children born with cleft lips and palates.

A charitable performance was given at the Grand Charity Ball 2017 in Uralsk hosted by the Alpamys Sharimov Foundation. It was held under the motto "Love for All" and the profits were donated to seriously ill people in Kazakhstan.

Kudaibergen gave a charity performance at the "Chinese National Wind Charity Concert", in Beijing, that was held under the motto "Pray for the Year". It was hosted by the China Children's Fund and the China Youth Foundation. The funds from the concert were used to enable music classes in rural Chinese primary schools that could not afford them.

He gave another charitable performance at the Villa International "Beauty Touching" charity event that was jointly hosted by the China Children and Teenagers Fund and "Bridge Culture" (supported by the China Intangible Cultural Heritage Protection Association).

Kudaibergen became goodwill ambassador of the "Listen Project" by the Audiology Development Foundation of China Trust Fund that provides hearing aid devices and education to hearing-impaired children.

A charitable performance was given at the Opening Gala of the Kazakh Snow Leopard Foundation whose goal is to save the endangered population and to preserve their natural habitat by creating protected areas.

On 19 November 2018, Kudaibergen gave a solo concert in London, UK, during the Great Britain's Days of Kazakhstan Culture. All proceeds went to promote young talent from Kazakhstan and sponsor youth participation in prestigious international contests.

Within the frame of the Shanghai Pet Adoption Day 2019, he became a supporter of the "Love is Home" initiative that aims to improve awareness and to increase adoptions of stray animals.

On his 25th birthday he visited a nursing home for the elderly and the physically impaired in his hometown Aktobe. As it is customary for him on his birthday since his school days, he brought gifts and spent time with the residents. He also performed for them a cappella.

A few days before his "Arnau" Concert of 29 June 2019, in Astana, Kazakhstan, there were explosions near the Kazakhstan city of Arys that caused injuries and casualties. Kudaibergen decided to donate funds from his concert to the victims.

When he was in the Russian city of Kazan for his performance at the WorldSkills 2019, he visited the local children's hospice to see a seriously ill fan who couldn't attend Kudaibergen's concert due to chemotherapy.

When he was in Kyiv, Ukraine, for his Arnau Tour, he donated clothes and other belongings to an auction for the Ukrainian Okhmatdyt Center for Pedriatric Toxicology that aims to save the lives of children with acute poisoning, and also enables hemodialysis for children with low weight, heart problems and unstable blood pressure.

During COVID-19 pandemic in Kazakhstan, Kudaibergen provided 102 needy families in Nur-Sultan and Aktobe with five tons of food.

On 7 October 2020, Kudaibergen announced his partnership with Michael Kors in support of the charity campaign Food Is Love with the United Nations World Food Programme (WFP).
Kudaibergen and his fans actively participated in the PR campaign during October and November, to draw people's attention to the problem of world hunger through support for the WFP.

In December 2020 a director of Project C.U.R.E., Melisa Espositi, announced Kudaibergen as their new Global Ambassador and organized a ticket giveaway for the Dimash Digital Show charity concert.

On 5 January 2021, it was announced that for the first time in the history of relations between the United States and Kazakhstan, a Kazakh artist, Dimash Kudaibergen was to take part in the annual Sister Cities International (SCI) event, opening the week of celebrations for the inauguration of the newly elected President of the United States, and included award presentations for the 2020 Eisenhower Peace Prize and the Distinguished Leadership.

On 16 January 2021, with encore performances until 23 January, as well as on 31 January, the Dimash Digital Show charity concert streamed on Tixr with funds being donated to Project C.U.R.E.
Kudaibergen had been earlier named as their Global Ambassador.

On 10 March 2021, Kudaibergen took part in Project C.U.R.E.'s International Women's Day with his video of "We Are One".
At that time, the president of Project C.U.R.E., Dr Douglas Jackson, confirmed that partial proceeds of the Dimash Digital Show had been donated to healthcare in Kazakhstan.

On September 14, 2022, Dimash Kudaibergen met with Pope Francis and received a commemorative medal from him about the pontiff's visit to the VII Congress of Leaders of World and Traditional Religions in Nur-Sultan.

2022 Kazakh protests
During the 2022 Kazakh protests, Kudaibergen published an Instagram post on 4 January 2022 calling for a peaceful solution to the issues raised by the protesters as well as internal stability and calmness. Kudaibergen was one of the very few Kazakh celebrities to comment on the protests. On 5 January 2022, Kudaibergen's account went offline without any explanation. He had over 3 million followers and was one of the most followed Kazakh accounts on the platform. On 6 January, his producer and composer Igor Krutoy claimed in a comment on his own Instagram account that Kudaibergen's account had been put offline following the events.

References

External links 
 Dimash Qudaibergen on Facebook
 Dimash Kudaibergen on Instagram
 Dimash Qudaibergen on Youtube

1994 births
Living people
Countertenors
Opera crossover singers
Kazakhstani pop singers
Kazakh folk singers
21st-century Kazakhstani male singers
Mandarin-language singers
Russian-language singers
Italian-language singers
21st-century multi-instrumentalists
Singers with a six-octave or greater vocal range
People from Aktobe
Russian National Music Award winners
Slavianski Bazaar winners
Tenors